Coleophora namaqua is a species of moth in the family Coleophoridae. It is found in South Africa, where it has been recorded from the Northern Cape.

References 

 

namaqua
Moths described in 2015
Moths of Africa